Damián Gonzalo Albil (born 9 February 1979) is an Argentine former football goalkeeper.

Career

Albil started his career with Independiente in 2000. He was part of the championship winning squad in Apertura 2002.

In 2004, he joined Estudiantes de La Plata and was the unused reserve goalkeeper when they won the Apertura 2006 tournament. In 2009, he watched from the bench as Estudiantes won Copa Libertadores 2009 with Mariano Andújar in goal. Albil was the goalkeeper for Estudiantes in the final of the 2009 FIFA Club World Cup, where they lost to FC Barcelona 2-1 after extra time.

In 2010, after 6 years in Estudiantes, the Argentine goalkeeper was loaned to San Lorenzo de Almagro.

Honours
Independiente
Argentine Primera División: 2002 Apertura
Copa Sudamericana: 2017

Estudiantes de La Plata
Argentine Primera División: 2006 Apertura
Copa Libertadores: 2009

References

External links
 Argentine Primera statistics at Fútbol XXI  
 
 

1979 births
Living people
People from Lomas de Zamora
Argentine footballers
Association football goalkeepers
Argentine Primera División players
Club Atlético Independiente footballers
Estudiantes de La Plata footballers
San Lorenzo de Almagro footballers
Club Atlético Tigre footballers
Ferro Carril Oeste footballers
Central Córdoba de Santiago del Estero footballers
Sportspeople from Buenos Aires Province